Tarmon is an electoral division south of Tarbert in County Kerry, Ireland. It is in the municipal district of Listowel, barony of Iraghticonnor and civil parish of Kilnaughtin, and the former rural district of Listowel and dispensary district of Tarbert. The population was 207 in 1901 and 521 in 2011.

References

Geography of County Kerry